Jann Sonya McFarlane (born 22 May 1944), Australian politician, was an Australian Labor Party member of the Australian House of Representatives from October 1998 to October 2004, representing the Division of Stirling, Western Australia. She was born in Sydney, and was educated at Macquarie University, Sydney. She was a clerk, secretary, and community worker before entering politics. She was defeated by Liberal candidate Michael Keenan at the 2004 election.

References

1944 births
Living people
Australian Labor Party members of the Parliament of Australia
Members of the Australian House of Representatives for Stirling
Clerks
Women members of the Australian House of Representatives
21st-century Australian politicians
21st-century Australian women politicians
20th-century Australian politicians
20th-century Australian women politicians